Henry Campion (c. 1680 – 17 April 1761), of Combwell, Goudhurst, Kent,  was a British Tory politician who sat in the House of Commons from 1708 to 1715. He later became an active Jacobite.

Early life

Campion was the son of William Campion of Combwell, Kent, and his wife Frances Glynne, daughter of Sir John Glynne of Henley Park, Surrey. He was educated at Enfield Grammar School and was admitted at Trinity College, Cambridge on 2 December 1697. He was admitted to Lincoln's Inn in January 1698. On 8 June 1702, he married Barbara Courthope, the daughter and heiress of Peter Courthope of Danny Park, Sussex.

Career
Although his father was a Whig lawyer, Campion was returned  as Tory Member of Parliament for East Grinstead at the 1708 British general election. He told for the Tories several times and voted against the impeachment of Dr Sacheverell in 1710. He did not stand at the 1710 British general election, but was returned as MP for Bossiney at a by-election on 22 December  1710. At the  1713 British general election he was returned as MP  for Sussex in a contest and also  for Helston. He  chose to sit for Sussex and was highly active within the House of Commons..

After 1715 Campion became an active Jacobite and served in the Jacobite rebellion as a messenger and organizer. As a result he had to spend the next few years abroad, before returning to England in 1720. In 1725 he came into possession of Danny Park where he lived until his death.

Death and legacy
Campion died on 17 April 1761 and was buried at Hurstpierpoint.  He left a son, William and a daughter, Katherine, who had married a George Courthope.

References

Year of birth uncertain
1761 deaths
People educated at Enfield Grammar School
Alumni of Trinity College, Cambridge
Members of the Parliament of Great Britain for constituencies in Cornwall
Members of the Parliament of Great Britain for English constituencies
British MPs 1708–1710
British MPs 1710–1713
British MPs 1713–1715
Place of birth unknown
English Jacobites